Lilla Crawford (born 2000 or 2001) is an American actress best known for portraying the title role in the 2012 Broadway revival of Annie. She made her feature-film debut playing Little Red Riding Hood in the 2014 Disney film adaptation of Into the Woods. Since 2017, Crawford has voiced Sunny in the Nickelodeon series Sunny Day and has starred in the Netflix series The Who Was? Show

Career
Crawford  began her career at the age of six appearing in commercials, and since then has appeared in several more. She states that she begged her mother to find her an agent because it was her dream to be an animated voice. 

She moved from Los Angeles to New York City, where she made her Broadway debut in 2011 as Debbie in the closing cast of the musical Billy Elliot. 

After a nationwide search, she won the title role in James Lapine’s 2012 revival of the Tony-winning musical Annie at the age of 11, after having previously been in a community theatre production of the same show, where she played Bert Healy. She competed against over 5,000 other girls auditioning to play Annie over a span of nine months. After her initial audition in New York she had five or six callbacks, the final one with a dozen girls. While performing in Annie, she filmed the Broadway.com video blog "Simply Red" for the show, which earned her a broadway.com title of "most clicked stars of 2013". 

She played "The Little Girl" in Ragtime at Avery Fisher Hall, alongside Lea Salonga, Norm Lewis, and many others. Crawford played Little Katie in a workshop production of Home the Musical by Scott Alan in New York City. She also appeared in a workshop of Melissa Arctic. 

Crawford played Little Red Riding Hood in the Disney film adaption of the musical Into the Woods. The film was released on December 25, 2014. 

As of 2017, Crawford voices the leading character on the Nickelodeon animated series Sunny Day. She also starred in the Netflix series The Who Was? Show, based on the book series Who Was.

Filmography

References

External links
 
 Star File: Lilla Crawford

Living people
American child actresses
21st-century American actresses
American film actresses
American stage actresses
American voice actresses
Date of birth missing (living people)
Place of birth missing (living people)
Actresses from Los Angeles
2000s births